Spangler, Pennsylvania was a town, since merged, and former borough located in the northwest corner of Cambria County, Pennsylvania, United States. It is nestled in the valley of the West Branch of the Susquehanna River between hills of the Appalachian Mountains of the Eastern United States.  The area was first settled by Europeans in the early-to-middle 19th century.  The presence of the West Branch of the Susquehanna River allowed loggers to move their harvest down river.  Small farms developed and the town came into existence in 1893 when mining of extensive bituminous coal fields in the area became the dominant industry.  The mining companies required skilled workers and many came from Great Britain and Eastern Europe.  Railroads were built to transport the coal and the town flourished from economic activity.

1922 mining disaster
A mining disaster occurred on November 6, 1922 at Reilly No. 1 Mine. Seventy-nine miners were killed when an explosion occurred at 7:20 a.m. after 112 men had begun work. The explosion blew out some stoppings and overcasts and also the side and end walls of the fan housing.  Help was called from other mines and from the Bureau of Mines at Pittsburgh. The fan housing was patched and the fan started, making the concrete-lined, 112 foot shaft an intake.  Recovery workers without apparatus encountered a live man making his way out to fresh air and brought him and four others out.  All were badly affected by mine gases, as were 18 of the rescuers.  Apparatus crews were then admitted, and 22 other survivors were rescued.  Five other men made their way out unassisted. Seventy-six bodies were found, and three of the rescued men died. The reasons for the explosion were explained. The mine had been rated gaseous in 1918, but at the insistence of the new operators it was rated as non-gaseous although a fireboss was employed and men burned by gas on at least four occasions. The low-volatile dust of the coal helped to spread the explosion. Gas that had accumulated in one or more rooms through open doors and deficient ventilation was ignited by the miners' open lights.  Fireboss examinations were neglected and incomplete. A monument constructed to the memory of those lost in this disaster stands in a park near the center of the town.

1971 Fire Claims Firefighter Lives
While a winter storm accumulated 11 inches of fresh snow and temperatures near 0 degrees, a fire broke out in Weaver's Variety Shop on January 1, 1971. More than 100 volunteer firefighters from Spangler and surrounding companies fought the fire under severe weather conditions. A wall collapsed killing two firemen, Frank Kinkead, 47, and John DeDea,32, both of nearby Patton, PA. Other firemen were injured. The fire destroyed three buildings, including the old Spangler Theater along the main street, Bigler Avenue.

Town planning
Because the town of Spangler was laid out with only one main street close to the Susquehanna's riverbed and only one to three parallel streets the town adopted the motto: "The Longest Little Town in the World" due to the length of the main street, Bigler Avenue. Spangler existed from 1893 until January 1, 2000 when it merged with the adjacent borough of Barnesboro to create the Borough of Northern Cambria. The local public school district is the Northern Cambria School District, whose athletic teams play under the nickname "Colts" and wear black and gold as the school colors. The current zip code of Northern Cambria is 15714.

Spangler is located at 40°39'21" North, 78°46'46" West (40.655813, -78.779472).

Notable residents

 Frank Brazill, baseball player, was born in Spangler.
 Chris Columbus, director of Home Alone, Mrs. Doubtfire, and the first two Harry Potter movies, was born in Spangler.
 George Magulick, player in the National Football League in 1944, was born in Spangler.
 Cheryl Strayed, memoirist, novelist and essayist portrayed by Reese Witherspoon in the film Wild, was born in Spangler.

References

External links
Northern Cambria community website
 History of Barnesboro, Spangler and Northern Cambria
 http://patheoldminer.rootsweb.ancestry.com/camreilly1.html Coal Miners Memorial

The Clearfield Progress, Clearfield, PA, Nov. 7, 1922. "Reilly No. 1 Mine, Spangler, PA; 79 Miners Killed"

The Indiana Gazette, Indiana, PA, 2 January 1971. "Spangler Blaze Kills Two Patton Firemen"

Former municipalities in Pennsylvania
Populated places established in 1893
Geography of Cambria County, Pennsylvania
Populated places disestablished in 2000